The Infinite Order is the seventh studio album from Christian metal band Living Sacrifice released January 26, 2010. The album, produced by Jeremiah Scott and mixed by Andy Sneap marks a return for the band since their prior album in 2002.  Because the manufacturer used the wrong master, the first pressing has an additional song "Of My Flesh, Of My Heart" on track 12 that was intended to be a bonus track on a possible European release. Future pressings will have the intended 11 tracks. They have since made a deluxe edition of the album available only through iTunes. The deluxe edition features new artwork, one bonus studio track, two live bonus tracks, and the In Finite Live DVD. Music videos were made for the songs "Rules of Engagement" and "Overkill Exposure". "Love Forgives" is inspired by the book of 1 Corinthians 13.

Track listing
All lyrics written by Living Sacrifice and composed by Living Sacrifice

Personnel 

Living Sacrifice
Bruce Fitzhugh - lead vocals, rhythm guitar
Rocky Gray - lead guitar
Arthur Green - bass, backing vocals
Lance Garvin - drums, percussion

Guest musicians
David Bunton - vocals on tracks 2 and 9
Joe Musten - vocals on track 3, additional percussion on track 3
Drew Garrison - vocals on track 6
Jason Truby - guitar on track 5
Mike Ferrara - acoustic guitar on track 11
Chris Dauphin - orchestration on track 11
Zach Bohannon - additional percussion on track 10

Production
Recorded by Barry Poynter at Poynter Recording
Produced by Jeremiah Scott, Living Sacrifice
Mixed by Andy Sneap
A&R by Jon Dunn
Art
Illustrations by Dave Quiggle
Layout by Ryan Clark
Photos by Keaton Andrew

References

External links 
Release page

Living Sacrifice albums
2010 albums
Solid State Records albums